Financial Oversight and Management Board for Puerto Rico (FOMBPR), colloquially known as La Junta de Control/Supervisión Fiscal is a government entity whose role to revise and approve the budget and obligations of the government of Puerto Rico was created by federal law PROMESA.

History

Creation
On August 31, 2016, Barack Obama appointed the seven members of the board.

In March 2017, Natalie Jaresko, former Minister of Finance in Ukraine, was appointed as the board's executive director. In 2019, Christian Sobrino, PROMESA's Representative of the Puerto Rican government, resigned in the wake of the Telegramgate scandal effective immediately on July 13 2019. On September 1, 2020, El Nuevo Día newspaper reports that USDA Rural Development State Director Josué Rivera was mentioned as a potential nominee for the Board.

FOMBPR v. Aurelius Investment, LLC

Composition of the FOMBPR

Current members

Former members

Officers

Authority
Appointed by the Speaker of the House of Representatives and the President of the United States, La Junta has authority over the commonwealth’s budget, with a mandate to maneuver the liquidity crisis that the island's government faces amidst a shrinking economy and a debt crisis. The board has the authority over “the prompt enforcement of any applicable laws of the covered territory prohibiting public sector employees from participating in a strike or lockout” (PROMESA, 559). La Junta also has the power to fast-track approval of infrastructure projects and public-private partnerships. The law also gives total immunity to the board members in the face of any potential lawsuits.

Opposition
Puerto Rican business leaders, scholars, teachers, performing artists, and activists have led protests against La Junta. In July 2019, hundreds of thousands of people rallied in the streets of San Juan to chants for Governor Ricardo Rosselló to “resign and take the “junta” with you." Many argue that The Financial Oversight and Management Board for Puerto Rico amounts to the return of colonial rule over Puerto Rico. Among them, Dr. Ronald Mendoza-de Jesus wrote, "Many, myself included, feel that the time has come to finally dispel the fantasy of Puerto Rico’s sovereignty under US rule and to take up again the question of the economic and ontological implications of striving to become a sovereign nation." Puerto Rican filmmaker Francis Negrón-Muntaner argues in "The Emptying Island," that PROMESA "marks a transition to a new iteration of colonial-capitalism". Negrón-Muntaner notes that the Board is "composed of individuals with deep ties to the banking and investment world—including some involved in producing the debt crisis—and granted them broad powers over Puerto Rico’s elected government to assure that creditors will be paid.” In 2019, thirteen members of the United States Congress included Alexandria Ocasio-Cortez and Bernie Sanders signed a letter that demanded that the Puerto Rico fiscal oversight board, known as “la junta,” disclose its conflicts of interest.

See also
 Puerto Rican government-debt crisis
 Territories of the United States 
 PROMESA

References

Economy of Puerto Rico
2016 in Puerto Rico
Government bonds
Local government finance
History of Puerto Rico by topic
Presidency of Barack Obama
United States federal boards, commissions, and committees